Agnes of the Palatinate (1201–1267) was a daughter of Henry V, Count Palatine of the Rhine and his first wife Agnes of Hohenstaufen, daughter of Conrad, Count Palatine of the Rhine. Agnes was Duchess of Bavaria by her marriage to Otto II Wittelsbach, Duke of Bavaria.

Family 
Agnes was the youngest of three children born to her father by both of his marriages. Her father's second wife, also called Agnes, was the daughter of Conrad II, Margrave of Lusatia. Agnes' older sister was Irmgard, wife of Herman V, Margrave of Baden-Baden and her brother was Henry VI, Count Palatine of the Rhine.

Marriage 
Agnes married Otto II at Worms when he came of age in 1222. With this marriage, the Wittelsbach family inherited Palatinate and kept it as a Wittelsbach possession until 1918. Since that time also the lion has become a heraldic symbol in the coat-of-arms for Bavaria and the Palatinate.

In 1231 upon the death of Otto's father, Louis I, Duke of Bavaria, Otto and Agnes became Duke and Duchess of Bavaria.

After a dispute with Emperor Frederick II was ended, Otto joined the Hohenstaufen party in 1241. Their daughter, Elizabeth, was married to Frederick's son Conrad IV. Because of this, Otto was excommunicated by the pope.

Within thirty-one years of marriage, the couple had five children:

 Louis II, Duke of Bavaria (13 April 1229, Heidelberg – 2 February 1294, Heidelberg).
 Henry XIII, Duke of Bavaria (19 November 1235, Landshut – 3 February 1290, Burghausen).
 Elisabeth of Bavaria, Queen of Germany (c. 1227, Landshut – 9 October 1273), married to:
 1246 in Vohburg to Conrad IV of Germany;
 1259 in Munich to Count Meinhard II of Gorizia-Tyrol, Duke of Carinthia.
 Sophie (1236, Landshut – 9 August 1289, Castle Hirschberg), married 1258 to Count Gerhard IV of Sulzbach and Hirschberg.
 Agnes (c. 1240–c. 1306), a nun.

Otto died 29 November 1253. Agnes died fourteen years later in 1267. She is buried at Scheyern.

Ancestry

References

Sources

1201 births
1267 deaths
13th-century German women
House of Welf
House of Wittelsbach
Daughters of monarchs